Kenneth Foulkes (birth registered first ¼ 1944 – August 2022) was an English professional rugby league footballer who played in the 1960s. He played at club level for Castleford (Heritage № 471), and Hull F.C. (Heritage №)

Playing career

County League appearances
Kenneth Foulkes played in Castleford's victory in the Yorkshire County League during the 1964–65 season.

Personal life and death
Kenneth Foulkes' birth was registered in Pontefract district, West Riding of Yorkshire, England. He died in August 2022, at the age of 78.

References

External links
Search for "Foulkes" at rugbyleagueproject.org
Ken Foulkes Memory Box Search at archive.castigersheritage.com

1944 births
2022 deaths
Castleford Tigers players
English rugby league players
Hull F.C. coaches
Hull F.C. players
Rugby league players from Pontefract